Galle is a surname. Notable people with the surname include:

Carl Galle, German athlete
Cornelis Galle (disambiguation), multiple people
Émile Gallé, French artist
Johann Gottfried Galle, German astronomer
Philip Galle, Dutch publisher
Pierre Galle, French basketball player